Lyanka Georgievna Gryu (born 22 November 1987) is a Russian theater and film actress.

Biography 
Lyanka Gryu was born in Moscow, Russian SFSR, Soviet Union. Her father was Moldovan actor Gheorghe Grâu (Gryu). Her mother was Russian actress Stella Ilnitskaya. Her parents separated when Lyanka was a child, and the father no longer maintains ties with the family.

Gryu first appeared in film at four years old. At that time, her mother was finishing the Gerasimov Institute of Cinematography (VGIK) and together with the four-year old Lyanka lived in a dormitory. In the corridors of the institute, Lyanka was noticed by chance was offered a role in the short film One, based on a story by Ray Bradbury. The film received a large number of prizes in Europe as well as smaller festivals.

At the insistence of producers, Gryu worked under the stage name  Lyana Ilnitskaya, a name the executives felt was more palatable to Russian audiences.

At the age of six, Gryu hosted a children's TV show called Tic-Tac.

Her first major role was Becky in the movie A Little Princess (1997) by director Vladimir Grammatikov. For her role in the film, Ilnitskaya won the prize for Best Actress at the Rolan Bykov Moscow International Children's Film Festival, and the prize for Best Actress at the Film Festival Orlyonok.

In 2000, Ilnitskaya was filmed by director Oleg Pogodin in Triumph: Diary of the Red, a story revolving around the main characters, children, playing adult games. The actress was 13 years old at the time.  The film was never released.

At 18 years, before entering the acting department Gerasimov Institute of Cinematography (course of Vladimir Grammatikov) Gryu stopped using her stage name and began working as Lyanka Gryu.

Gryu's career bloomed in 2009, when she performed in two title roles: The Return of the Musketeers, or The Treasures of Cardinal Mazarin Georgi Yungvald-Khilkevich, where she played the daughter of D'Artagnan Jacqueline; and the series Barvikha, where she played Evgeniya Kolesnichenko - a student from the "City" elite school. For the role of the daughter of D'Artagnan, Lyanka spent over 2 months in preparation, learning both horseback riding and fencing.

In summer 2011, Gryu was chosen for the role of Irene Adler in the new Russian series about the adventures of Sherlock Holmes with Igor Petrenko in the title role.

In 2016, Gryu performed in the US independent film Impossible Monsters by Nathan Catucci and FX's television series The Americans.

Gryu is married and has a son.

Filmography 
1992: One as Katya 
1996: The Third Son as episode
1997: A Little Princess as Becky
1998: Who If Not Us as Irochka
2000: Triumph as Katya
2001: Detectives 4 as Lena
2001: Naked Nature as Ksyusha
2005: Popsa as Alisa
2005 / 2007: Doomed to Become A Star as Violetta
2006: Rogues as Nastya
2007: Experts as Inna
2009: The Return of the Musketeers, or The Treasures of Cardinal Mazarin as Jacqueline, the daughter of D Artagnan
2009: Barvikha as Zhenya Kolesnichenko
2010: Skipped Parts as Darya
2010: Heart to Heart as Zhenya 
2013: In a Sport Only Girl as Jane
2013: Sherlock Holmes as Irene Adler
2014: The Pregnancy Test as Olga Olshanskaya
2017 / 2018: The Americans as Elina Sachko
2019: Impossible Monsters as Shayna

References

External links
 
 

1987 births
Living people
Russian film actresses
Russian television actresses
Russian stage actresses
Gerasimov Institute of Cinematography alumni
Actresses from Moscow
21st-century Russian actresses
20th-century Russian actresses
Russian people of Moldovan descent
Russian child actresses
Russian TikTokers